The Dynamic Billard Klagenfurt Open 2018 (sometimes known as the 2018 Austrian Open) was the fifth and penultimate Euro Tour 9-Ball pool event in 2018. The event was won by Austria's Mario He who defeated England's Mark Gray 9–8 in the final. This was He's 4th championship, and second of the Euro Tour season - having already won the 2018 Veldhoven Open.

Ralf Souquet was the defending champion, after having won the 2017 Klagenfurt Open, but lost matches to Kim Laaksonen and Maksim Dudanets in the double elimination round.

Tournament format
The event saw a total of 193 players compete, in a double-elimination knockout tournament, until the last 32 stage; where the tournament was contested as single elimination.

Prize fund 
The tournament prize fund was similar to that of other Euro Tour events, with €4,500 for the winner of the event.

Tournament results

References

External links

Euro Tour
2018 Euro Tour events
Sporting events in Austria
October 2018 sports events in Austria
Klagenfurt Open
International sports competitions hosted by Austria
Sports competitions in Klagenfurt